The 1998 UAB Blazers football team represented the University of Alabama at Birmingham (UAB) in the college football season of 1998, and was the eighth team fielded by the school. The Blazers' head coach was Watson Brown, who entered his fourth season as UAB's head coach. They played five of their home games at Legion Field in Birmingham, Alabama and one home game at the Hoover Metropolitan Stadium in Hoover, and competed as a Division I-A Independent. The Blazers finished their third season at the I-A level with a record of 4–7.

Schedule

References

UAB
UAB Blazers football seasons
UAB Blazers football